Biljanovce is a village in the municipality of Kumanovo, North Macedonia.

Demographics
As of the 2021 census, Biljanovce had 1,423 residents with the following ethnic composition:
Macedonians 1,251
Persons for whom data are taken from administrative sources 117
Serbs 40
Others 15

According to the 2002 census, the village had a total of 1,231 inhabitants. Ethnic groups in the village include:
Macedonians 1,203
Serbs 24 
Others 4

References

External links

Villages in Kumanovo Municipality